FC Fribourg is a Swiss football club from the town of Fribourg in the Canton of Fribourg. In the 2022/23 season, the team is playing in 2. Liga Interregional, the fifth highest tier in the Swiss football pyramid.

History

The club was founded on 21 October 1900 and began life as FC Technicum. It took its name from the local school where nine young men gathered in the school brewery to establish the foundations for a football club. The majority of the men were not local, most of the men were students from England. The team had to wait over a year for their first match. On 27 October 1901 the club lost 4–1 to Club Romand.

On 25 September 1904, FC Technicum became a member of Swiss Football Association. On 12 November 1904 the club changed its name to Stella FC. The club at the time were competing in Nationalliga B, the second highest tier in Swiss football. It was around this time, in 1909, that the club held their first match against foreign opponents by playing two matches against Milan Football and Cricket Club. In 1909 the club were promoted to Swiss Super League but lasted just two seasons and in 1911 the club were relegated. In 1910 the club opened a junior team, led by local priest Father Freeley, to serve as a nursery side for the 1st team. This, at the time, was considered to be something new. The junior side was named FC College.

World War I put a stop to the club's progress and between 1914 and 1916 the club did not participate in any official championship. On 22 July 1917 the club changed its name to its present name, FC Fribourg.

In 1929 the club was back in the Swiss Super League but again this was just for two seasons as in 1931 the club dropped down a tier.

During World War II there was some minor interruptions to the football calendar but in the 1939/40 season the club narrowly missed out on promotion back to the Super League by losing a play-off match against FC Basel.

The golden era of the club was in the 1950s. At the end of the 1951/52 season the club were champions of Nationalliga B and so were back in the top flight to play in the 1952/53 season. The club spent four years in the top league finishing 9th in 1952/53, 12th in 1952/53, 10th in 1954/55 and 14th place in 1955/56. In 1954 the club also reached the final of the Swiss Cup losing 2–0 to FC La Chaux-de-Fonds, the best Swiss club at that time, inside the Wankdorf Stadium which later became the Stade de Suisse.

In the 1960/61 season the club was back in the top flight but were relegated in 1962 after only two seasons, finishing in last place. In 1969 the club were back in the top flight but again the club lasted just two years and were relegated in 1971. The club bounced back at the first attempt and at the end of the 1971/72 season they gained promotion back to the Super League but lasted just one term, as they suffered relegation at the end of the 1972/73 season. This was to be for the last time as to this day the club have not played in the top level of Swiss football.

Directly following their relegation to the second tier, the club suffered relegation again to the third tier, the 1. Liga, for the first time in their history at the end of the 1973/74 season. The club stayed at that level for four years before returning to the Nationalliga B. The club remained at this level until 1999 when they suffered relegation to the 1. Liga Promotion.

Stadium
FC Fribourg play their home games at Stade Universitaire. The capacity is 9,000. The stadium has 1,000 seats and 8,000 standing places.

Current squad

Honours
Ligue Nationale B/Challenge League
Winners: 1951–52

External links
Official Website 

 
Fribourg
Association football clubs established in 1900
1900 establishments in Switzerland
Fribourg